Leuctra is a genus of rolled-winged stoneflies in the family Leuctridae. There are at least 210 described species in Leuctra.

See also
 List of Leuctra species

References

Further reading

External links

 

Plecoptera
Articles created by Qbugbot